Wugunai (1021–1074) was a chieftain of the Wanyan tribe, the most dominant among the Jurchen tribes which later founded the Jin dynasty (1115–1234). He was the eldest son of Shilu. Like his father, Wugunai was appointed chieftain of the Wanyan tribe by the Khitan-led Liao dynasty, which ruled northern China between the 10th and 11th centuries. Historical sources describe Wugunai as a brave warrior, great eater and hard drinker, and a lover of women.

Wugunai was posthumously honoured with the temple name Jingzu (景祖) by his descendant, Emperor Xizong.

Family
 Father: Shilu
 Mother: Lady Tushan (徒單氏), posthumously honoured as Empress Weishun (威順皇后)
 Spouse: Lady Tangkuo (唐括氏), posthumously honoured as Empress Zhaosu (昭肅皇后), bore Hezhe, Helibo, Hesun, Pocishu and Yingge
 Concubines:
 Zhusihui (注思灰), of Khitan descent, bore Hezhenbao
 Lady Wendihen (溫迪痕氏), personal name Diben (敵本), bore Mapo, Alihemen and Manduke
 Sons:
 Hezhe (劾者), Duke of Han (韓國公)
 Helibo, posthumously honoured as Emperor Shizu
 Hesun (劾孫), Duke of Yi (沂國公)
 Pocishu (頗刺淑), posthumously honoured as Emperor Suzong (肅宗)
 Yingge (盈歌), posthumously honoured as Emperor Muzong (穆宗)
 Hezhenbao (劾真保), Duke of Dai (代國公)
 Mapo (麻頗), Duke of Yu (虞國公)
 Alihemen (阿離合懣), Duke of Sui (隋國公)
 Manduhe (謾都訶), Duke of Zheng (鄭國公)

References

Citations

Sources 

 

Jurchen rulers
1021 births
1074 deaths